Tulid is a state constituency in Sabah, Malaysia, that is represented in the Sabah State Legislative Assembly. This is one of the thirteen new state constituencies as result of approval from state legislative and Dewan Rakyat on 17 July 2019, being contested for the first time as part of the 2020 snap election

History

Representation history

Election results

References 

Sabah state constituencies